Samuel Stewart Watson House, also known as Ermeling House, is a historic home located at St. Charles, St. Charles County, Missouri. It was built in 1859, and is a two-story, Italianate style brick dwelling with a hipped roof. It features a broad denticulated cornice with heavy brackets, segmentally arched windows, and a classically inspired portico.

It was added to the National Register of Historic Places in 1982.

References

Houses on the National Register of Historic Places in Missouri
Italianate architecture in Missouri
Houses completed in 1859
Buildings and structures in St. Charles County, Missouri
National Register of Historic Places in St. Charles County, Missouri